The 2022–23 Chennaiyin  season is the club's Ninth season since its establishment in 2014 as well as their Ninth season in 2022–23 Indian Super League season.In addition to the league, they will also compete in the 2022 Durand Cup and AIFF Super Cup.

Management team

Durand Cup Squad

  denotes a player who is unavailable for rest of the season.

Players

Squad Information

  denotes a player who is unavailable for rest of the season.

Transfers

In

Out

Pre-season and friendlies

Competitions

Overall record

Durand Cup

Indian Super League

League table

Matches

Super Cup

References

Chennaiyin FC seasons
2022–23 Indian Super League season by team